Exarchos is a village and a community of the Grevena municipality. Before the 2011 local government reform it was a part of the municipality of Ventzio, of which it was a municipal district. The 2011 census recorded 58 residents in the village and 110 residents in the community. The community of Exarchos covers an area of 55.552 km2.

Administrative division
The community of Exarchos consists of two separate settlements: 
Exarchos (population 62)
Varis (population 48)
The aforementioned population figures are as of 2011.

See also
 List of settlements in the Grevena regional unit

References

Populated places in Grevena (regional unit)